Heel-and-toe shifting is an advanced driving technique used mostly in performance driving with a manual gearbox, although some drivers use it on the road in everyday conditions in the interest of effectiveness. It involves operating the throttle and brake pedals simultaneously with the right foot, while facilitating normal activation of the clutch with the left foot. It is used when braking and downshifting simultaneously (prior to entering a turn), and allows the driver to "blip" the throttle to raise the engine speed and smoothly engage the lower gear. (See synchronized transmission.)

Usage
Heel-and-toe shifting is used before entry into a turn while a vehicle is under braking, preparing the transmission to be in the optimal range of rpm to accelerate out of the turn. One benefit of downshifting before entering a turn is to eliminate the jolt to the drivetrain, or any other unwanted dynamics. The jolt will not upset the vehicle as badly when going in a straight line, but the same jolt while turning may upset the vehicle enough to cause loss of traction if it occurs after the turn has begun. Sporting vehicles are usually modified (if necessary) so that the heights of the brake and accelerator pedals are closely matched when the brake is sufficiently depressed, and the pedals are not too far apart to permit easy use of heel-and-toe.

The name stems from pre-WW2 vehicles where the accelerator pedal was in the centre (between the clutch on the left and the foot brake to the right). The brake was able to be operated with the heel whilst the accelerator pedal could be simultaneously pressed with the toe. The technique is carried out in modern cars by operating the brake with the toe area, while rocking the foot across to the right to operate the throttle with the right side of the foot. With practice, it becomes possible to smoothly and independently operate both pedals with one foot.

As the power band of most race cars is found high in the rev range, this technique can also be used to ensure that engine rpm does not drop below the power band of the car while under braking, by allowing a lower gear to keep the engine in the desired rev range. The importance of this is to avoid delay between the driver accelerating after the corner and when the car responds. This is especially true in turbocharged cars where not only is it important to maintain the required rev range for strong positive boost, but the 'blipping' of the accelerator can also be used to maintain turbine speeds and thus avoid turbo lag. This technique ensures that maximum power can be reached the instant the brake pedal is released and the accelerator fully depressed.

Rowing is the technique of downshifting more than one gear along with the heel-and-toe technique to provide engine braking and smoother deceleration/braking while in the intermediate gears. This provides for maximum braking when going from a top gear to a much lower gear, and optimal engine RPM for exiting the corner.

Synchronized down shift rev-matching system 
The synchronized down shift rev-matching system is a technology that mimics this technique and performs it on behalf of the driver.

References 

 Speed Secrets: Professional Race Driving Techniques by Ross Bentley - 
 Secrets of Solo Racing: Expert Techniques for Autocrossing and Time Trials by Henry A. Watts -

External links
 Edmunds HOW TO with photos
 Heel and toe shifting explained with illustrations
 YouTube instructional video
 Fundamental Skills of Heel-and-Toe
 Ayrton Senna's heel-and-toe braking technique

Driving techniques